Pennsylvania Route 868 (PA 868) is a  state highway located in Bedford county in Pennsylvania.  The southern terminus is at PA 36 in South Woodbury Township.  The northern terminus is at PA 867 in Bloomfield Township.

Route description

PA 868 begins at an intersection with PA 36 in the community of Waterside in South Woodbury Township, heading northwest on two-lane undivided Potter Creek Road. The road heads through an agricultural valley with some woods and residences, passing through a corner of Woodbury Township before entering Bloomfield Township. The route passes through the community of Maria prior to continuing through more forested areas with some farm fields and homes. PA 868 curves to the north through open farmland and comes to its northern terminus at PA 867.

Major intersections

See also

References

External links

Pennsylvania Highways: PA 868

868